Juan Alberto Sabia (born 17 December 1981) is an Argentine professional footballer who plays as a centre-back for Torneo Federal A side Libertad.

Career
Sabia started his professional career in 2000 playing for Ben Hur in the Torneo Argentino A. In 2005, he won the Torneo Argentino A with the club and therefore won promotion to the Primera B Nacional (second division). The defender played one season with Ben Hur in the Primera B Nacional and then joined Gimnasia y Esgrima de Jujuy in the Argentine Primera División, in 2006. After one season with Gimnasia, Sabia joined Argentinos Juniors in 2007.

Sabia quickly established himself as a regular starter for Argentinos Juniors and in 2010 helped the team obtain the 2010 Clausura championship, the club's first top-flight honour in 25 years. The defender played in 14 of the club's 19 games during their championship winning campaign, scoring one goal in the penultimate fixture win against Independiente.

In 2013, Sabia joined Vélez Sársfield on a free transfer, signing for a year and a half.

Honours
Ben Hur
Torneo Argentino A (1): 2004–05
Argentinos Juniors
Argentine Primera División (1): 2010 Clausura
Vélez Sarsfield
Supercopa Argentina (1): 2013

References

External links
 Profile at Vélez Sarsfield's official website
 Argentine Primera statistics at Fútbol XXI  

1981 births
Living people
People from Pergamino
Argentine footballers
Association football defenders
Argentine Primera División players
Primera Nacional players
Torneo Federal A players
Gimnasia y Esgrima de Jujuy footballers
Argentinos Juniors footballers
Club Atlético Vélez Sarsfield footballers
Libertad de Sunchales footballers
Sportspeople from Buenos Aires Province